Shearer's inequality or also Shearer's lemma, in mathematics, is an inequality in information theory relating the entropy of a set of variables to the entropies of a collection of subsets. It is named for mathematician James B. Shearer.

Concretely, it states that if X1, ..., Xd are random variables and S1, ..., Sn are subsets of {1, 2, ..., d} such that every integer between 1 and d lies in at least r of these subsets, then

 

Combinatorial version 
Then

See also 

 Lovász local lemma

References 

Information theory
Inequalities